The 49th Infantry Division was a division of the Chinese People's Liberation Army.
It was formed in March 1952 and in August designated as a light division of the national defense force. It was the second PRC infantry division numbered 49; the previous 49th Division had been disestablished in 1950-51.

The division was organized from units and detachments of the 5th Army Group left in Guizhou province.

The division was composed of:
145th Infantry Regiment;
146th Infantry Regiment (former 137th);
147th Infantry Regiment (former 141st);
307th Artillery Regiment.

From April 1955 the division was put under the Kunming Military Region's control.

From June 1957 the division was transferred to the Chengdu Military Region's control, but the division returned to the Kunming MR in May 1958.

From April 1960 the division was renamed as the 49th Army Division.

From August 1967 to 1968, Anti-Aircraft Artillery Regiment, 49th Army Division was deployed to North Vietnam for air defense missions. During its deployment it allegedly shot down one U.S. aircraft and damaged another.

In November 1969, the division was transferred to the newly formed the 11th Army Corps and later redesignated as the 31st Army Division. All its regiments were redesignated as follows:
91st Infantry Regiment (former 145th);
92nd Infantry Regiment (former 146th);
93rd Infantry Regiment (former 147th);
Artillery Regiment (former 307th).

From February to March 1979 the division took part in the Sino-Vietnamese War. During its deployment the division killed 1402 and captured 54 PAVN soldiers.

During the 1984 Battle of Laoshan, the PLA launched their assault on Laoshan at 05:00 on 28 April after intense artillery bombardment. PLA forces were estimated to outnumber the size of PAVN ones. The PLA 40th Division of the 14th Army crossed the border section to the west of the Lô River, while the 31st Division took Hill 1200 on the eastern bank.

In October 1985 the division was transferred to the 14th Army and renamed the 31st Motorized Infantry Division, as a southern motorized infantry division. Anti-Aircraft Artillery Regiment, 31st Motorized Infantry Division was established.

In 1998, the 91st Infantry Regiment merged with the 18th Tank Regiment, 5th Tank Division as the Armored Regiment, 31st Motorized Infantry Division. Since then the division has been composed of:
92nd Motorized Infantry Regiment;
93rd Motorized Infantry Regiment;
Armored Regiment;
Artillery Regiment;
Anti-Aircraft Regiment.

In 2013 the division was split into two brigades: the 31st Mechanized Infantry Brigade and 32nd Mountain Motorized Infantry Brigade.

In April 2017 the 31st brigade was reorganized as the 31st Heavy Combined Arms Brigade, while the 32nd Brigade was reorganized as the 32nd Mountain Combined Arms Brigade. Both brigades are now part of the PLA 75th Group Army, stationed in Dali, Yunnan.

References
中国人民解放军各步兵师沿革，http://blog.sina.com.cn/s/blog_a3f74a990101cp1q.html

 

Infantry divisions of the People's Liberation Army
Military units and formations established in 1952